J. B. Bullen (Barrie Bullen) is an interdisciplinary writer specialising in examining the relationship between literature, mostly English literature, and art in the 19th and 20th centuries.

Work
Bullen has written on Coleridge, Ruskin, Dickens, George Eliot, Dante Gabriel Rossetti, and Thomas Hardy. He is the editor of two notable series for the Peter Lang publishing company: Cultural Interactions: Studies in the Relationship between the Arts and Writing and (with Isobel Armstrong) Culture in the Long Nineteenth Century. Bullen took his first degree at the University of Cambridge. This was followed by spells as a researcher at the University of Oxford and at the University of Reading, where he remains an emeritus professor. He now holds the Chair of English Literature and Culture in the Department of English Literature at Royal Holloway, University of London.

Private life
Bullen's spouse is the writer and painter Roma Tearne. They have three children.

Selected publications
1986: The Expressive Eye: Vision and Perception in the Work of Thomas Hardy, Oxford: Oxford University Press
1995: The Myth of the Renaissance in Nineteenth-Century Writing, Oxford: Oxford University Press
1998: The Pre-Raphaelite Body: Fear and Desire in Painting, Poetry, and Criticism, Oxford: Oxford University Press
2003: Byzantium rediscovered, London: Phaidon.
2011: Rossetti: Painter and Poet, London: Frances Lincoln
2013: Thomas Hardy: the World of his Novels, London: Frances Lincoln

References

Living people
Academics of the University of Reading
British writers
Place of birth missing (living people)
Year of birth missing (living people)
Alumni of Pembroke College, Cambridge
Academics of Royal Holloway, University of London